Holy Trinity Catholic High School or Holy Trinity Catholic Secondary School may refer to:

Canada 
Holy Trinity Catholic High School (Edmonton) in Edmonton, Alberta
Holy Trinity Catholic High School (Fort McMurray) in Fort McMurray, Alberta
Holy Trinity Catholic High School (Kanata) in Kanata, Ontario
Holy Trinity Catholic High School (Simcoe) in Simcoe, Ontario
Holy Trinity Catholic Secondary School (Cornwall, Ontario) in Cornwall, Ontario
Holy Trinity Catholic Secondary School (Oakville), in Oakville, Ontario
Holy Trinity Catholic Secondary School (Courtice), in Courtice, Ontario

United States 
Holy Trinity Catholic High School (Texas) in Temple, Texas
Holy Trinity Catholic Schools, Fort Madison, Iowa - Includes Holy Trinity Catholic Junior/Senior High School

See also 
Holy Trinity School (disambiguation)